The following nations and athletes competed in the 2022 FIA Motorsport Games at Circuit Paul Ricard in Le Castellet, France, from 29 to 31 October 2022.

Team Albania
Automobile Club Albania entered four athletes across three disciplines.

Esports
Andri Gjoka

Crosscar Senior
Gentjan Shaqiri

Karting Slalom
Aleks Begolli
Nancy Vathi

Team Andorra
The Automobile Club of Andorra entered one athlete in one discipline.

Esports
Octavio Pisco

Team Argentina
The Argentine Automobile Club entered five athletes across four disciplines.

Touring Car
Ignacio Montenegro

Drifting
Rodrigo Gallo

Crosscar Junior
Juan Manuel Grigera

Rally2 Cup
Paulo Soria
Marcelo der Ohannesian

Team Australia
Motorsport Australia entered eight athletes across seven disciplines.

GT Relay
Brenton Grove
Stephen Grove

GT Sprint
Matthew Campbell

Touring Car
Aaron Cameron

Formula 4
Costa Toparis

Esports
Philippa Boquida

Karting Sprint Junior
Peter Bouzinelos

Karting Sprint Senior
Aiva Anagnostidis

Team Austria
The Austrian Automobile Motorcycle and Touring Club entered four athletes across four disciplines.

Formula 4
Charlie Wurz

Drifting
Daniel Brandner

Esports
Felix Temper

Karting Sprint Senior
Oscar Wurz

Team Bahamas
The Bahamas Motor Sports Association entered seven athletes across three disciplines.

Esports
Dominick Robinson

Karting Endurance
Christopher Bain
Jashai Burrows
Ramando Hudson
Giselle Liriano

Karting Slalom
Caden Burbridge
Maria Scott

Team Bangladesh
The Automobile Association of Bangladesh entered one athlete in one discipline.

Esports

 Arhaam Rahaman

Team Barbados
The Barbados Motoring Federation entered two athletes across two disciplines.

Esports
Leon Sealy

Karting Sprint Senior
Calem Maloney

Team Belgium
The Royal Automobile Club of Belgium entered twenty-one athletes across fourteen disciplines.

GT Sprint
Dries Vanthoor

Touring Car
Gilles Magnus

Formula 4
Lorens Lecertua

Drifting
Pieter van Hoorick

Esports
Mathias Kühn

Crosscar Junior
Romuald Demelenne

Crosscar Senior
Kobe Pauwels

Rally2 Cup
Cédric de Cecco
Jérôme Humblet

Rally4 Cup
Tom Rensonnet
Loïc Dumont

Karting Sprint Junior
Thibaut Ramaekers

Karting Sprint Senior
Elie Goldstein

Karting Endurance
Maxime Drion
Antoine Morlet
Jeremy Peclers
Sita Vanmeert

Karting Slalom
Romy Degroote
Dario Pemov

Auto Slalom
Dylan Czaplicki
Lyssia Baudet

Team Belize
The Belize Automobile Club entered two athletes in one discipline.

Karting Slalom
Emery Paul Nicholas
Rosabell Dueck

Team Brazil
The Brazilian Auto Racing Confederation entered eleven athletes across nine disciplines.

GT Relay
Adalberto Baptista
Bruno Baptista

GT Sprint
Bruno Baptista

Touring Car
Raphael Reis

Formula 4
Pedro Clerot

Esports
Igor Rodrigues

Rally2 Cup
Adroaldo Weisheimer
 Rafael Capoani

Karting Sprint Junior
Gabriel Koenigkan

Karting Sprint Senior
João Maranhão

Auto Slalom
Bruno Pierozan
Kaká Magno

Team Canada
The Groupe de Développement Sportif entered three athletes across two disciplines.

Touring Car
Travis Hill

Karting Slalom
Keaton Dietrich
Paige Dietrich

Team Chile
The Chilean Federation of Motor Sport entered three athletes across three disciplines.

Formula 4
Maria José Pérez de Arce

Esports
Nicolás Rubilar

Karting Sprint Senior
Gustavo Suárez

Team Chinese Taipei
The Chinese Taipei Motor Sports Association entered twelve athletes across seven disciplines.

GT Relay
Chen Yi-Fan
Chen Wen-Ko

GT Sprint
Chen Yi-Fan

Formula 4
Ho Cheng-Chuan

Esports
Lin Kuei-Min

Karting Sprint Senior
Chou Chun-Ting

Karting Endurance
Tsai Yu-Hsuan
Lo Chun-Yao
Cheng Hsiao-Hsu
Chung Chen-Yu

Auto Slalom
Lin Chun-Ta
Shen Yu-Ru

Team Costa Rica
The Automobile Club of Costa Rica entered two athletes across two disciplines.

Karting Sprint Junior
Diego Ardiles

Karting Sprint Senior
Gabriel Kawer

Team Croatia
The Croatian Automobile & Karting Federation entered three athletes across two disciplines.

Esports
Mihael Matika

Auto Slalom
Nenad Damarija
Iva Damarija

Team Czech Republic
The Autoclub of the Czech Republic entered twelve athletes across seven disciplines.

Drifting
Marco Zakouřil

Esports
Martin Kadlečík

Crosscar Senior
Adam Kotaška

Rally Historic Cup

František Rajnoha

Karting Sprint Junior
Jakub Kameník

Karting Endurance
Ondřej Kočka
Aleš Burger
Zdeněk Ošťádal
Soňa Ptáčková

Auto Slalom
Dominik Šurýn
Dagmar Kamas Bělíková

Team Denmark
The Danish Automobile Sports Union entered seven athletes across six disciplines.

Formula 4
Julius Dinesen

Drifting
Mikkel Overgaard

Esports
Mikkel Gade

Rally4 Cup
Casper Nielsen
 Ward Hanssens

Karting Sprint Junior
Mikkel Pedersen

Karting Sprint Senior
Valdemar Aggerholm

Team Estonia
The Estonian Autosport Union entered fourteen athletes across ten disciplines.

Drifting
Kevin Pesur

Esports
Juss Parek

Crosscar Junior
Armin Raag

Crosscar Senior
Martin Juga

Rally2 Cup
Georg Linnamäe
 James Morgan

Rally Historic Cup
Marko Mättik
Arvo Maslenikov

Karting Sprint Junior
Mark Dubnitski

Karting Sprint Senior
Carmen Kraav

Karting Slalom
Martaliisa Meindorf
Jürgen Laansoo

Auto Slalom
Hanna Lisette Aabna
Kevin Lempu

Team Finland
AKK Motorsport entered two athletes across two disciplines.

Drifting
Juha Pöytälaakso

Karting Sprint Junior
Kimi Tani

Team France
The Fédération Française du Sport Automobile entered fourteen athletes across eleven disciplines.

GT Relay
Eric Debard
Simon Gachet

GT Sprint
Tristan Vautier

Touring Car
Teddy Clairet

Formula 4
Pablo Sarrazin

Drifting
Jason Banet

Esports
Alexandre Lê

Crosscar Junior
Etan Pepujol

Crosscar Senior
David Meat

Rally2 Cup
Mathieu Arzeno
Romain Roche

Rally Historic Cup
Philippe Gache
Philippe David

Karting Sprint Junior
Jules Caranta

Team Georgia
The Georgian Automobile Sport Federation entered twelve athletes across seven disciplines.

Formula 4
Sandro Tavartkiladze

Drifting
Nodo Kodua

Esports
Sandro Chanturia

Karting Sprint Junior
Lado Kukhianidze

Karting Endurance
Nika Kobosnidze
Mariam Tsiklauri
Archil Tsimakuridze
Mariam Davitidze

Karting Slalom
Sandro Kajaia
Nutsa Makhatchadze

Auto Slalom
Mevlud Meladze
Irina Onashvili

Team Germany
The Deutscher Motor Sport Bund entered eighteen athletes across thirteen disciplines.

GT Relay
Fabian Schiller
Valentin Pierburg

GT Sprint
Luca Stolz

Formula 4
Valentin Kluß

Drifting
Gerson Junginger

Esports
Constantin Tscharf

Crosscar Junior
Samuel Drews	

Crosscar Senior
Tim Braumüller

Rally2 Cup
Björn Satorius
Hanna Ostlender

Rally Historic Cup
Renate Mayr
Siegfried Mayr

Karting Sprint Junior
Mathilda Paatz	

Karting Sprint Senior
Maximilian Schleimer

Karting Slalom
Sebastian Romberg
Annika Spielberger

Auto Slalom
Claire Schönborn
Marcel Hellberg

Team Greece
The Hellenic Motorsport Federation entered six athletes across four disciplines.

Drifting
George Lagos

Esports
Harris Mitropoulos	

Rally2 Cup
Nikos Pavlidis
Dimitris Amaxopoulos

Rally4 Cup
Paschalis Hatzimarkos
Marios Tsaussoglou

Team Guatemala
The Automobile Club of Guatemala entered one athlete in one discipline.

Esports
Juanes Morales

Team Hong Kong
The Hong Kong Automobile Association entered thirteen athletes across nine disciplines.

GT Relay
Ip Kung-Ching
Lee Ying-Kin

GT Sprint
Lee Ying-Kin

Touring Car
Yan Cheuk Wai

Formula 4
Thong Wei-Heen

Drifting
Ng Ka-Ki

Esports
Wong Kai-Hin

Karting Sprint Senior
Yu Ka-Po

Karting Endurance
Chung Pui-Yan
Ho Man-Cheong
Wong King-Chi
Yeung Tak

Karting Slalom
Mok Sum-Nga
Ng Jaden

Team Hungary
The National Automobile Sport Federation of Hungary entered eleven athletes across eight disciplines.

Formula 4
Zénó Kovács

Drifting
Péter Utasi

Esports
Kristóf Artzt

Crosscar Junior
Kristóf Csuti

Rally2 Cup
Martin László
Dávid Berendi

Karting Sprint Senior
Balázs Juráncsik

Karting Slalom
Ádám Szabó
Lilla Horn

Auto Slalom
Martin Bognár
Tünde Deák

Team Iceland
The Icelandic Motorsport Association entered one athlete in one discipline.

Esports
Hákon Jökulsson

Team India
The Federation of Motor Sports Clubs of India entered seven athletes across five disciplines.

Formula 4
Ruhaan Alva

Rally4 Cup
Sanjay Takale
 Mike Young

Karting Sprint Junior
Ishaan Madesh

Karting Sprint Senior
Kyle Kumaran

Auto Slalom
Prateek Dalal
Pragathi Gowda

Team Indonesia
The Indonesian Motor Association entered three athletes across three disciplines.

Esports
Presley Martono

Karting Sprint Junior
Aditya Wibowo

Karting Sprint Senior
Kaenan Reza Sini

Team Ireland
Motorsport Ireland entered one athlete in one discipline.

Touring Car
Jack Young

Team Israel
The Automobile and Touring Club of Israel entered twelve athletes across seven disciplines.

Esports
Denis Gribov

Crosscar Senior
Adar Melamed

Karting Sprint Junior
Yam Pinto

Karting Sprint Senior
Ariel Elkin

Karting Endurance
Itzik Shahar
Yaniv Hershkowitz
Ran Ben Ezer
Yordan Oved

Karting Slalom
Chen Ido
Eva Garlink

Auto Slalom
Tal Sharig
Yuval Ravitz

Team Italy
The Automobile Club d'Italia entered ten athletes across eight disciplines.

GT Sprint
Mirko Bortolotti

Touring Car
Giacomo Ghermandi

Formula 4
Andrea Kimi Antonelli

Drifting
Manuel Vacca	

Esports
Luca Losio	

Crosscar Senior
Simone Firenze

Rally4 Cup
Roberto Daprà
Luca Guglielmetti

Rally Historic Cup
Andrea Zivian
Nicola Arena

Team Japan
The Japan Automobile Federation entered one athlete in one discipline.

Esports
Sota Muto

Team Kosovo
The Federation of Auto Sport of Kosovo entered five athletes across three disciplines.

Esports
Visar Gjikolli	

Karting Slalom
Baran Karabeg
Rea Gashi

Auto Slalom
Ermira Topalli
Valon Jaha

Team Kuwait
The Kuwait International Automobile Club entered three athletes across three disciplines.

Drifting
Ali Makhseed

Esports
Rashed Al-Rashdan

Karting Sprint Senior
Fahad Al-Khaled

Team Latvia
The Latvian Federation of Motor Vehicles entered six athletes across five disciplines.

Touring Car
Valters Zviedris

Drifting
Kristaps Blušs

Esports
Andrejs Gubarevs

Crosscar Senior
Reinis Nitišs

Auto Slalom
Toms Ozols
Maija Stakena

Team Lithuania
The Lithuanian Automobile Sport Federation entered nine athletes across seven disciplines.

GT Relay
Jonas Gelžinis
Eimantas Navikauskas

GT Sprint
Julius Adomavičius

Drifting
Benediktas Čirba

Esports
Tauras Gudinavičius

Karting Sprint Junior
Markas Šilkūnas

Karting Sprint Senior
Adrijus Rimkevičius

Auto Slalom
Evelina Drilingienė
Vytis Pauliukonis

Team Luxembourg
The Automobile Club of Luxembourg entered two athletes across two disciplines.

Drifting
Rohan van Riel	

Esports
Daniel Lahyr

Team Malaysia
The Motorsports Association of Malaysia entered two athletes across two disciplines.

Formula 4
Alister Yoong

Esports
Naquib Azman

Team Malta
The Malta Motorsport Federation entered nine athletes across five disciplines.

Esports
Dean Vella	

Karting Sprint Junior
Kian Gauci	

Karting Sprint Senior
Lucas Pace	

Karting Endurance
Ella Zammit
Nicky Gauci
Owen Mangion
Kyle Mercieca

Karting Slalom
Raisa Psaila
Kieran Galea

Team Mexico
The Mexican International Motor Sport Federation entered four athletes across three disciplines.

Esports
Michael Teichmann

Rally4 Cup
Gustavo Urióstegui
 Axel Coronado

Karting Sprint Junior
Edgar Rodríguez

Team Morocco
The Royal Moroccan Federation of Motor Sport entered one athlete in one discipline.

GT Sprint
Michaël Benyahia

Team Mozambique
The Automobile and Touring Club of Mozambique entered five athletes across five disciplines.

Formula 4
Guilherme Rocha

Drifting
Zanil Satar

Esports
Dylan Jesus

Karting Sprint Junior
Ghazi Motlekar

Karting Sprint Senior
Cristian Bouché

Team Nepal
The Nepal Automobiles' Association entered three athletes across two disciplines.

Karting Sprint Senior
Diprash Shakya

Auto Slalom
Anil Kumar Baral
Jiswan Tuladhar Shrestha

Team Netherlands
The KNAC National Autosport Federation entered nine athletes across seven disciplines.

Touring Car
Tom Coronel

Drifting
Rick van Goethem

Esports
Chris Harteveld	

Crosscar Junior
Nathan Ottink	

Crosscar Senior
Jari van Hoof

Rally4 Cup
Martijn van Hoek
Nard Ippen

Karting Slalom
Naomi de Groot
Lukas Stiefelhagen

Team Nigeria
The Automobile Sports Club of Nigeria entered five athletes across four disciplines.

Esports
Segun Akin-Olugbade

Karting Sprint Junior
Baruch Roy-Bako

Karting Sprint Senior
Philip Gana

Karting Slalom
John Nenger
Damilola Ademokoya

Team Norway
The Royal Norwegian Automobile Club entered five athletes across five disciplines.

Touring Car
Didrik Esbjug	

Drifting
Odd-Helge Helstad	

Esports
Tommy Østgaard	

Crosscar Junior
Eirik Steinsholt	

Crosscar Senior
Ole-Henry Steinsholt

Team Panama
The Automotive Association of Touring and Sports of Panama entered two athletes across two disciplines.

Formula 4
Valentino Miní

Karting Sprint Senior
Valentín Flammini

Team Peru
The Touring and Automobile Club of Peru entered ten athletes across five disciplines.

Esports
Ian Kishimoto	

Karting Sprint Junior
Andrés Cárdenas	

Karting Endurance
Taylor Greenfield
Harold Watson
Mark Harten
Maje Esquivel

Karting Slalom
Claudio Bisso
Carolina Harten

Auto Slalom
Andrea Takashima
Roberto Takashima

Team Poland
The Polish Automobile and Motorcycle Association entered fifteen athletes across nine disciplines.

GT Relay
Karol Basz
Marcin Jedlinski

Drifting
Jakub Przygoński

Esports
Marcin Świderek

Crosscar Senior
Maciej Laskowski

Karting Sprint Junior
Borys Łyżeń

Karting Sprint Senior
Adrian Łabuda

Karting Endurance
Marcel Kuc
Kornelia Olkucka
Jakub Rajski
Adam Szydłowski

Karting Slalom
Karol Król
Emilia Rotko

Auto Slalom
Daniel Dymurski
Sara Kałuzińska

Team Portugal
The Portuguese Federation of Auto Racing and Karting entered twelve athletes across eight disciplines.

Formula 4
Manuel Espírito Santo

Drifting
João Vieira

Esports
João Cavaca

Crosscar Junior
Guilherme Matos

Rally4 Cup
Ricardo Sousa
Luís Marques

Karting Sprint Junior
Rodrigo Seabra

Karting Sprint Senior
Francisca Queiroz

Karting Endurance
Sofia Correia
Mariana Machado
Rita Teixeira
Anastacia Khomyn

Team Puerto Rico
The Racing Federation of Puerto Rico entered two athletes in one discipline.

GT Relay
Víctor Gómez
Francesco Piovanetti

Team Romania
The Automobile Club of Romania entered three athletes across two disciplines.

Drifting
Calin Ciortan

Rally4 Cup
Cristiana Oprea
Alexia-Denisa Parteni

Team Serbia
The Auto-Moto Association of Serbia entered one athlete in one discipline.

Formula 4
Filip Jenić

Team Singapore
Motor Sports Singapore entered one athlete in one discipline.

Esports
Muhammad Aleef

Team Slovakia
The Slovak Association of Motor Sport entered fourteen athletes across eight disciplines.

Esports
Bence Bánki

Crosscar Senior
Tomi Baráti

Rally Historic Cup
Jaroslav Petrán
Iveta Halčinová

Karting Sprint Junior
Matej Koník

Karting Sprint Senior
Matúš Borec

Karting Endurance
Veronika Dobrotová
Juraj Mlčuch
Imi Szakal
Matej Koczo

Karting Slalom
Margareta Mahutová
Lukáš Borec

Auto Slalom
Michaela Dorčíková
Dávid Nemček

Team Slovenia
The Auto Sport Federation of Slovenia entered four athletes across three disciplines.

Esports
Jug Klemen

Karting Sprint Junior
Aleksandar Bogunović

Auto Slalom
Nejc Trček
Rebeka Kobal

Team Spain
The Royal Spanish Automobile Federation entered twenty-five athletes across sixteen disciplines.

GT Relay
Gonzalo de Andrés
Fernando Navarrete

GT Sprint
Daniel Juncadella

Touring Car
Isidro Callejas

Formula 4
Bruno del Pino	

Drifting
Álex Pérez

Esports
Alberto García	

Crosscar Junior
Diego Martínez	

Crosscar Senior
Iván Piña	

Rally2 Cup
Pepe López
Borja Rozada

Rally4 Cup
Óscar Palomo
Rodrigo Sanjuán

Rally Historic Cup
Antonio Sainz
Miguel de la Puente

Karting Sprint Junior
Aarón García	

Karting Sprint Senior
Nacho Tuñón	

Karting Endurance
Álvaro Bajo
Alba Cano
José Manuel Pérez-Aicart
Iván Velasco

Karting Slalom
Álvaro Gutiérrez
Lucía Gimeno

Auto Slalom
Miguel García Pérez-Carrillo
Laura Aparicio

Team South Africa
Motorsport South Africa entered four athletes across three disciplines.

Esports
Koketso Pilane	

Karting Sprint Junior
Dhivyen Naidoo

Auto Slalom
Paige de Jager
Warren Barkhuizen

Team South Korea
The Korea Automobile Racing Association entered two athletes across two disciplines.

Formula 4
Shin Woo-hyeon

Esports
Park Yun-ho

Team Sri Lanka
The Ceylon Motor Sports Club entered two athletes across two disciplines.

Esports
Savi Rathnayake

Karting Sprint Senior
David Yevan

Team Sweden
The Svenska Bilsportförbundet entered nine athletes across eight disciplines.

Touring Car
Andreas Bäckman

Drifting
Mikael Johansson

Esports
Mikael Sundström

Crosscar Junior
Alex Gustafsson

Crosscar Senior
Patrik Hallberg

Rally2 Cup
Jari Liiten
John Stigh

Karting Sprint Junior
Scott Kin Lindblom

Karting Sprint Senior
Joel Bergström

Team Switzerland
Auto Sport Suisse entered seven athletes across seven disciplines.

GT Relay
Yannick Mettler
Dexter Müller

GT Sprint
Yannick Mettler

Touring Car
Gabriel Lusquiños

Formula 4
Dario Cabanelas

Drifting
Nicolas Maunoir

Esports
Thomas Schmid

Karting Sprint Junior
Elia Epifanio

Team Turkey
The Turkish Automobile Sports Federation entered ten athletes across eight disciplines.

GT Sprint
Ayhancan Güven

Drifting
Timur Pomak	

Esports
Ulaş Özyıldırım

Crosscar Junior
Can Alakoç

Crosscar Senior
Kerem Kazaz

Rally2 Cup
Orhan Avcıoğlu
Burçin Korkmaz

Rally4 Cup
Ali Türkkan
Burak Erdener

Karting Sprint Junior
Alp Hasan Aksoy

Team United Arab Emirates
The Automobile & Touring Club of the United Arab Emirates entered five athletes across two disciplines.

Esports
Sultan Abdulrahman

Karting Endurance
Marian Al-Hosani
Ahmad Al-Boom
Ahmad Al-Hamadi
Humaid Al-Ketbi

Team United Kingdom
Motorsport UK entered seventeen athletes across ten disciplines.

GT Relay
Christopher Froggatt
Ian Loggie

Touring Car
Chris Smiley

Drifting
Martin Richards

Esports
James Baldwin

Crosscar Junior
Corey Padgett	

Crosscar Senior
Daniel Rooke

Rally2 Cup
Oliver Mellors
Ian Windress

Rally Historic Cup
Timothy Jones
Steven Jones

Karting Endurance
Owen Jenman
Jack O’Neill
Mike Philippou
Rhianna Purcocks

Auto Slalom
Laura Christmas
Mark King

Team Ukraine
The Automobile Federation of Ukraine entered thirteen athletes across ten disciplines.

GT Relay
Ivan Peklin
Evgeny Sokolovsky

Touring Car
Pavlo Chabanov	

Formula 4
Oleksandr Partyshev

Drifting
Dmitriy Ilyuk	

Esports
Devid Pastukhov	

Crosscar Junior
Nikita Botuk	

Karting Sprint Junior
Mark Brovko	

Karting Sprint Senior
Dmitriy Muravshchyk	

Karting Slalom
Mariya Kravchenko
Ivan Kondratenko

Auto Slalom
Tatyana Kaduchenko
Andriy Yaromenko

Team United States
The Automobile Competition Committee for the United States entered one athlete in one discipline.

Esports
Tyler Limsnukan

Team Uzbekistan
The National Automobile Club of Uzbekistan entered eleven athletes across six disciplines.

Formula 4
Ismoilkhuja Akhmedkhodjaev

Esports
Eldor Radjapov

Karting Sprint Junior
Amir Khamraev

Karting Endurance
Anastasiya Urunova
Adhamjon Egarmberdiev
Islomjon Ismoilov
Farukh Urunov

Karting Slalom
Yasmina Egamberdieva
Domenik Suleymanov

Auto Slalom
Sabina Atadjanova
Olim Akhmadjanov

Team Venezuela
The Touring and Automobile Club of Venezuela entered two athletes across two disciplines.

Touring Car
Sergio López	

Karting Sprint Senior
Andrés Ardiles

Team Vietnam
The Vietnamese Motorsports Association entered two athletes in one discipline.

Auto Slalom
Bảo Bảo
Kristian Béla

References